The following is a historical list of members for the current and past Legislative Assemblies of Macau:

Political bloc

List of Colonial members 
Key: DE– Directly elected members; IE– Indirectly elected members; AP– Appointed members

List of SAR members 
Key: DE– Directly elected members; IE– Indirectly elected members; AP– Appointed members

Notes

See also
 Legislative Assembly of Macau

References

External links
 2009-2013 AL Members
 2005-2009 AL Members
 2001-2005 AL Members

Macau-related lists
 
Members